Being Charlie is a 2015 American drama film directed by Rob Reiner and written by Matt Elisofon and Nick Reiner. The film stars Nick Robinson, Common, Cary Elwes, Devon Bostick, Morgan Saylor, Susan Misner and Ricardo Chavira. It was screened in the Special Presentations section of the 2015 Toronto International Film Festival on September 14, 2015. The film was released on May 6, 2016, by Paladin.

Plot
On his 18th birthday, troublesome addict Charlie, who has been in and out of rehab for years, walks out of a youth rehab facility in rural Utah. He does so without incident as he is legally an adult. As Charlie starts to walk toward the road, he turns back and throws a rock through a stained glass window of the facility's chapel.
 
Hitchhiking, Charlie is picked up by a man and his sick mother. The man agrees to drop him at a bus station after dropping her off home. However when he discovers Charlie has stolen his mother’s oxy cancer treatment, he throws him out of his truck.

Charlie calls Adam, his best friend and dealer, to come pick him up. When he arrives home to Los Angeles, his parents stage an intervention.

Charlie's father was a Hollywood star who’s running for governor of California. Now, given the choice between another try at rehab or going to jail in Utah for damaging the stained glass, Charlie is forced to go to adult rehab.

There, Charlie meets beautiful but afflicted Eva, another enabler. He also meets the typical group of wisecracking misfits, and the surprisingly down-to-earth ex-jailbird drug counsellor.

A man at Charlie's most recent inpatient facility who seems the most eager of the group, one day is just gone. Hoping the doctor would give him painkillers, he punched a concrete wall and simply walked away when he didn't get the medication he wanted.

The time at the inpatient facility moves by quickly—there's a routine—group meetings, yoga sessions, visits from and meetings with family members, tell your story to get a new chip every month. When Charlie moves to an outpatient house, the routine continues, albeit with some freedom.

The head of the house where Charlie stays tries to explain the problem with having a romance during recovery: Recovery is and must be selfish, as addiction is selfish. Hence Charlie’s relationship  with fellow addict Eva might not work out. Juxtaposing that blunt but compassionate support is Charlie's mother, who tries to give him the love and encouragement of two parents.

After Charlie and Eva have their weekend pass together, while he’s on cloud nine, the look on her face whenever he offers advice or talk about love tells a different story. Fear, desperation and, sometimes, just blankness. At one point, Eva tells Charlie that the program isn't working. He tells her it's different this time. "It is different," she responds, and there's a moment of clear misunderstanding: He thinks it's different because they have each other, while she realizes he doesn't get her.

Without warning, Eva leaves. Charlie abandons the outpatient home to find her. Taking a vehicle from his dad’s for the search, he tracks her down to Venice Beach. He declares he loves her, embracing her, but she seems vacant. Taking her to the beach house, although Eva slept in his arms,  by morning she’s left, and emptied two bottles of wine. She’s gone for good.

Outside of the program, Charlie falls off the wagon. He's on the streets for close to two weeks when he’s robbed. Broke, he seeks out Adam. They party, but at the end he ODs. Charlie is exonerated, but it makes the news. The next day is the election, so he takes off for the beach house.

Looking unlikely that David will win his gubernatorial run, he accompanies his inebriated wife to rest, when an aide seeks him out to inform him of his victory. A huge distraction from what really matters, he accepts his win alone.

The next day, David seeks out Charlie. They make peace, and Charlie plans to head out into the world. We see as the credits roll, he has become a standup comic.

Cast
Nick Robinson as Charlie Mills
Common as Travis
Cary Elwes as David Mills
Devon Bostick as Adam
Morgan Saylor as Eva
Susan Misner as Lisanne
Ricardo Chavira as Drake

Production
On April 22, 2015, it was announced Nick Robinson, Morgan Saylor, Common, Devon Bostick, Susan Misner, Ricardo Chavira and Cary Elwes would star in the film. Principal photography began in April 2015, and ended on May 7, 2015.

Release
The film premiered at the 2015 Toronto International Film Festival on September 14, 2015. The film was released on May 6, 2016, by Paladin.

Reception
Being Charlie received negative reviews from critics. On Rotten Tomatoes, the film has a rating of 23%, based on 43 reviews, with a rating of 5.09/10. On Metacritic, the film has a score of 47 out of 100, based on 18 critics, indicating "mixed or average reviews".

References

External links
 

2015 drama films
2015 films
American drama films
Castle Rock Entertainment films
Films directed by Rob Reiner
2010s English-language films
2010s American films